Compagnie des Montres Longines, Francillon S.A., or simply Longines, is a Swiss luxury watchmaker based in Saint-Imier, Switzerland. Founded by Auguste Agassiz in 1832, the company has been a subsidiary of the Swiss Swatch Group and its predecessors since 1983. Its winged hourglass logo, registered in 1889, is the oldest unchanged active trademark registered with WIPO.

History

1832–1867 
Longines was founded in Saint-Imier in 1832 by Auguste Agassiz, a Swiss watchmaker and brother of biologist Louis Agassiz. Auguste had two partners, lawyers Henri Raiguel and Florian Morel; the company's original name was Raiguel Jeune & Cie. By 1846, Raigeul and Morel had retired from the watch industry, leaving Agassiz as sole company head.

Several years later, Agassiz brought in his bright, enterprising nephew, trained economist Ernest Francillon, into the business. Francillon was the mastermind behind several impressive innovations that would distinguish the company from its competitors. One early stroke of genius from Francillon was to solely produce crown-wound pocket watches rather than the prevalent key-wound alternative. Later, when Agassiz started suffering from ill health, he passed leadership to Francillon.

1867–1878 
Under Francillon, the company began segueing out of the établissage system and moved towards more modern production methods. Francillon solidified his firm’s progression to mass production in 1867 by establishing his first factory. Its location, an area in southern St. Imier known locally as Les Longines (“long meadows”), gave rise to the Longines name. To help further his efforts to improve the production at Longines, Francillon brought on Jacques David, a talented engineer. In addition, Francillon appointed David as Technical Director and put him in charge of the new factory. By 1867, it was also marked the year the Longines factory produced its first in-house watch movement, the 20A. The 20A, built with an anchor escapement (usually employed in pendulum clocks), was wound and set via a pendent crown. The innovative movement won an award at the 1867 Universal Exhibition in Paris.

Several years later, the U.S. watchmaking industry was earning making strides in industrialized watch manufacturing. Francillon sent Jacques David to the 1876 World’s Fair in Philadelphia to gather new ideas and strategies from American watchmakers. Upon returning, David wrote a 108-page report detailing what he learned during his trip; the report is considered one of the most significant documents in watchmaking history, detailing the inner workings of American watch factories, including the entire production process, from raw materials to finished watches, and the highly-effective internal structure and quality control measures implemented in American factories. In his analysis, David concluded the Swiss watchmaking industry needed to change significantly to keep pace with its American competitors.

1878–1927 
In 1878, Longines developed its first chronograph movement, the 20H, a “mono-pusher” chronograph, in which all 3 chronograph functions (start, stop, and reset) were controlled via the crown. With the 20H, Longines could produce stopwatches suitable for precise timing in professional events. This was when Longines began building its reputation in equestrian sports, such as horse racing and jumping.

By 1880, Longines was known for the quality and precision of its timepieces. To Francillon’s dismay, the brand became a target for counterfeiters. Longines counterfeits were not only directly stealing business and revenue from Francillon, but also potentially damaging his company’s reputation. Francillon trademarked the Longines name in 1880 and its winged hourglass logo in 1889. By 1886, Longines had established itself as a primary supplier of timing equipment for most New York sporting officials.

Notable Longines calibers:

 Longines 20H pocket chronograph
 Longines 18.72 pocket chronograph
 Longines 19.73 pocket chronograph

1927–1971 
In 1927, P.V.H. Weems collaborated with Longines to produce the first wrist watch, the Weems Avigation watch. The watch was 47 mm in diameter.

In 1931, Longines collaborated with Charles Lindbergh to introduce the Hour Angle aviation
watch.

In 1937, P.V.H. Weems again collaborated with Longines to produce a second, smaller (33mm) Weems avigation watch (reference 3930, 3931, and 4036).

In 1954, Longines introduced a timekeeping instrument called Longines Chronocinegines.

Notable Longines calibers:

 Longines 12.68z time only or wrist watch chronograph
 Longines 13.33z wrist watch chronograph
 Longines 13ZN wrist watch chronograph
 Longines 30CH wrist watch chronograph
 Longines 37.9 time only

1971–present 
In 1983, Longines' owner ASUAG merged with SSIH (which owned Omega SA) to form the Société Suisse de Microélectronique et d'Horlogerie (SMH). SMH became The Swatch Group in 1988, and Longines continued without R&D and production activities of its own. In 2019, Longines licensed its name and branding to Marcolin for a collection of men’s and women’s optical frames and sunglasses.

Intellectual property and marketing 
Longines began using the slogan "Elegance is an Attitude" in 1999. Their previous slogan, "The World's Most Honoured Watch" was used for most of the 20th century.

The Longines Logo is the oldest registered trade mark still in use in its original form registered with the World Intellectual Property Organization.

Sponsorships 
Since Longines developed its first chronograph movement in 1878, the brand has steadily built strong relationships with various sporting organizations, events and teams worldwide. First came horse racing, then additional equestrian sports such as show jumping, endurance riding and eventing (a “triathlon” of dressage, cross-country, jumping).

Today, Longines is designated as official timekeeper, partner, and watch for competitions worldwide including:

 Formula One World Championship (1980s)
Archery World Cup
Commonwealth Games
French Open
World Artistic Gymnastics Championships
FEI Show Jumping World Cup
FIS Alpine Ski World Cup
Hong Kong International Races

Notable patrons and owners 

Notable Longines brand ambassadors and timepieces owners include Humphrey Bogart, Harry Connick Jr., Audrey Hepburn, Dr Nahum Sokolow, Lin Chi-ling, Eddie Peng, Steffi Graf, Andre Agassi, Aishwarya Rai, Kate Winslet, Mikaela Shiffrin, Simon Baker, Jung Woo-sung, Bae Suzy and Jennifer Lawrence.

Albert Einstein owned two timepieces from Longines, one 1943 silver pocket watch and one 1929 gold wristwatch. His Longines' wristwatch, which was presented to him by Rabbi Edgar Magnin in 1931, was auctioned by Antiquorum for US$596,000 in New York on 16 October 2008, making it the most expensive Longines' timepiece ever sold at auction. His Longines pocket watch is now kept in the Bern Historical Museum in Switzerland.

 United States Navy Captain Philip Van Horn Weems
 United States Army Air Corps Reserve Charles Lindbergh
 United States Navy Admiral Richard E. Byrd
 United Kingdom Royal Navy Vice-Admiral Sir James Andrew Gardiner Troup
 Amelia Earhart
 Howard Hughes
 Amy Johnson
 Ruth Nichols
 Elinor Smith
 Wiley Post
 Paul-Emile Victor
 Auguste and Jacques Piccard

See also
The Longines Symphonette
List of watch manufacturers

Notes

References

Further reading
 Donzé, Pierre-Yves. "Dynamics of innovation in the electronic watch industry: a comparative business history of Longines (Switzerland) and Seiko (Japan), 1960-1980." Essays in Economic & Business History 37.1 (2019): 120-145. online

External links

 
 The Swatch Group
 Longines Official Films
 The Oldest Longines Watch

Manufacturing companies established in 1832
Luxury brands
The Swatch Group
Swiss watch brands
Watch manufacturing companies of Switzerland